Clivina atrata is a species of ground beetle in the subfamily Scaritinae. It was described by Jules Putzeys in 1863.

References

atrata
Beetles described in 1863